Gorki Leninskiye is an urban locality (a work settlement) in Leninsky District of Moscow Oblast, Russia, located  south of Moscow city limits and the Moscow Ring Road. Its population is: 

The estate of Gorki belonged to various Muscovite noblemen from the 18th century. Zinaida Morozova, the widow of Savva Morozov, purchased it in 1909, the year before she married General Anatoly Reinbot (later Anatoly Rezvoy), the chief of Moscow police. She engaged the most fashionable Russian architect, Fyodor Schechtel, to remodel the mansion in the then-current Neoclassical style, complete with a six-column Ionic portico.

On 21 January 1924, Vladimir Lenin, the first leader of the Russian SFSR and subsequently the USSR, died at this estate, which he had used as his personal dacha since its nationalization in 1918.

Lenin's dacha

After the Soviet government moved to Moscow in 1918, it nationalized the luxurious estate and converted it into Vladimir Lenin's dacha. In September 1918, the Soviet leader recuperated there following an assassination attempt. He spent an increasing amount of time there as his health declined over the following years. On May 15, 1923, Lenin followed medical advice and left the Moscow Kremlin for Gorki. He lived there in semi-retirement until his death on January 21, 1924.

After Lenin's death, Gorki was renamed "Gorki Leninskiye" (meaning "Lenin's Gorki"). The house became a museum holding many of Lenin's possessions. Also located on the estate are a large museum built in 1987 concerning Lenin's life there, containing such artifacts as his Last Testament (as transcribed by Nadezhda Krupskaya), other documents, photos, books, Lenin's personal car (a Rolls-Royce Silver Ghost), his wheelchairs, and his apartment and office from the Kremlin, reconstructed in a separate building. A monument representing "The Death of the Vozhd" was unveiled in the 18th-century park in 1958.

See also
List of places named after Vladimir Lenin

References

External links

Official website 
State Historical Preserve "Gorki Leninskiye" site

Urban-type settlements in Moscow Oblast
Museums in Moscow Oblast
Vladimir Lenin
Historic house museums in Russia
Biographical museums in Russia